The Orange Way, so called because it follows the march in 1688 of Prince William of Orange and his army from Brixham to London, is a  unofficial long-distance walk in England that passes through Devon, Dorset, Wiltshire, Berkshire, Buckinghamshire and London.

Suggested route

 Day 1 Brixham to Berry Pomeroy – 10.5 miles
 Day 2 Berry Pomeroy to Chudleigh – 18 miles
 Day 3 Chudleigh to Exeter – 16 miles
 Day 4 Exeter to Woodbury – 9.5 miles
 Day 5 Woodbury to Honiton – 19 miles
 Day 6 Honiton to Axminster – 10.5 miles
 Day 7 Axminster to Beaminster – 17.5 miles
 Day 8 Beaminster to East Coker – 15 miles
 Day 9 East Coker to Goathill – 11 miles
 Day 10 Goathill to Wincanton – 15.5 miles
 Day 11 Wincanton to Hindon – 15 miles
 Day 12 Hindon to Salisbury – 19 miles
 Day 13 Salisbury to Amesbury – 10 miles
 Day 14 Amesbury to Everleigh – 14 miles
 Day 15 Everleigh to Burbage – 8 miles
 Day 16 Burbage to Hungerford – 16 miles
 Day 17 Hungerford to Chieveley – 14.5 miles
 Day 18 Chieveley to Abingdon – 19 miles
 Day 19 Abingdon to Wallingford – 13.5 miles
 Day 20 Wallingford to Whitchurch – 11 miles
 Day 21 Whitchurch to Henley – 16 miles
 Day 22 Henley to Marlow – 9 miles
 Day 23 Marlow to Windsor – 14 miles
 Day 24 Windsor to Brentford – 16 miles
 Day 25 Brentford to St James's Palace, London – 13 miles

References

Further reading

External links
 A walker's photographic record
 Site of William's First Parliament
 The Orange Way

Long-distance footpaths in England
Footpaths in Devon
Footpaths in Dorset
Footpaths in Somerset
Footpaths in Wiltshire
Footpaths in Berkshire
Footpaths in Buckinghamshire
Footpaths in London
Glorious Revolution